The outdoor men's doubles competition at the 1912 Summer Olympics was part of the tennis program for the games. There were 42 players from 10 nations, comprising 21 teams. Nations were limited to 4 pairs (8 players) each. The event was won by South African team Harold Kitson and Charles Winslow, defeating Austrians Felix Pipes and Arthur Zborzil in the final. It was the first medal in the event for both nations. France earned its first men's double since 1900 as Albert Canet and Édouard Mény de Marangue defeated Jaroslav Just and Ladislav Žemla of Bohemia in the bronze-medal match.

Background

This was the fifth appearance of the men's doubles tennis. The event has been held at every Summer Olympics where tennis has been on the program: from 1896 to 1924 and then from 1988 to the current program. A demonstration event was held in 1968. 1912 was the second and last time an indoor version was held concurrently.

The British brothers Laurence Doherty and Reginald Doherty had been dominant for the late 1890s and early 1900s, winning the 1900 Olympic championship and eight consecutive Wimbledon titles. Both had retired by 1912, however, and there was no dominant doubles team.

The 1908 Official Report's recommendation to schedule Olympic tennis not so close to Wimbledon was not acted upon; indeed, the scheduling issue was worse in 1912. Rather than starting three days after the end of Wimbledon, the Olympic outdoor tennis events were now at the same time as Wimbledon. The indoor events, held in May, were thus attended by top-flight players, while the outdoor competitions were not.

Denmark, Norway, Russia, and Sweden each made their debut in the event. Germany made its fourth appearance in the event, most among nations, having missed only the 1900 event.

Competition format

The competition was a single-elimination tournament with a bronze-medal match. All matches were best-of-five sets. Tiebreaks had not been invented yet.

Schedule

The tournament was beset by withdrawals.

Draw

Finals

Top half

Bottom half

Notes

External links

 
 
  ITF, 2008 Olympic Tennis Event Media Guide

1912

Men's outdoor doubles
Men's events at the 1912 Summer Olympics